The 2010 MTV Video Music Brazil, known as VMB 2010 in Brazil, was held on September 16, 2010, hosted by Marcelo Adnet and took place at the Credicard Hall, São Paulo. It awarded the best in Brazilian music, popular culture and internet culture in the year of 2010. The most notable moments in the show were the 5 awards received by pop band Restart, including for Best New Act and Act of the Year, this last sounded by boos from the audience. There was also a live performance by American alternative rock band OK Go, the appearance of electropop duo 3OH!3, Mexican singer Christian Chávez and Paraguayan model Larissa Riquelme, among many Brazilian personalities.

Nominations

Winners are in bold.

Act of the Year
 Otto
 Fresno
 Restart
 NX Zero
 Sandy
 Pitty
 Mallu Magalhães
 Capital Inicial
 Skank
 Arnaldo Antunes

Video of the Year
 Skank — "Noites de um Verão Qualquer"
 Mombojó — "Pa Pa Pa"
 NX Zero — "Só Rezo"
 Mallu Magalhães — "Shine Yellow"
 Marcelo D2 (featuring Zuzuca Poderosa and DJ Nuts) — "Meu Tambor"
 Capital Inicial — "Depois da Meia-Noite"
 Vespas Mandarinas — "Sem Nome"
 Diogo Nogueira — "Tô Fazendo a Minha Parte"
 Restart — "Recomeçar"
 Cine — "A Usurpadora"

Hit of the Year
 Restart — "Levo Comigo"
 NX Zero — "Só Rezo"
 Skank — "Noites de Um Verão Qualquer"
 Sandy — "Pés Cansados"
 Pitty — "Fracasso"

Best New Act
 Restart
 Hori
 Hevo 84
 Replace
 Karina Buhr

Best International Act
 Paramore
 The Black Eyed Peas
 Green Day
 Justin Bieber
 Tokio Hotel
 Jay-Z
 Kesha
 Lady Gaga
 Katy Perry
 Beyoncé

MTV Bet
 Flora Matos
 The Name
 Apanhador Só
 Unidade Imaginária
 Thiago Pethit

International Bet
 Janelle Monáe
 Darwin Deez
 School of Seven Bells
 Big K.R.I.T.
 Toro y Moi

Best Pop
 Mallu Magalhães
 Sandy
 Fresno
 Lulu Santos
 Restart

Best Rock
 Pitty
 Capital Inicial
 Glória
 NX Zero
 Strike

Best MPB
 Otto
 Diogo Nogueira
 Céu
 Cidadão Instigado
 Lucas Santana

Best Rap
 Kamau
 Ogi
 Rincon Sapiência
 Lurdez da Luz
 MV Bill

Best Electronic
 Gui Boratto
 Killer on the Dancefloor
 Zemaria
 Database
 Boss in Drama

Best Live Act
 Otto
 Pitty
 Arnaldo Antunes
 Capital Inicial
 NX Zero

Webstar
 PC Siqueira - maspoxavida
 Felipe Neto
 Mystery Guitar Man
 Katylene
 @OCriador

Web Hit of the Year
 Cala Boca Galvão ("Shut Up Galvão") - Save Galvão Birds Campaign
 Justin Biba ("Little Gay Justin") - Justin Bieber's "Baby" parody by Galo Frito
 Puta falta de sacanagem (fucking lack of immorality)
 Zeca Camargo yawning live in Fantástico (June 6, 2010)
 Dunga em Um Dia de Fúria ("Dunga's Day of Rage")

Video Game of the Year
 God of War III
 Super Mario Galaxy 2
 Batman Arkham Asylum
 Red Dead Redemption
 Call of Duty: Modern Warfare 2

Performances
 Restart (played live at the Victor Civita square) — "Recomeçar"
 Fresno — "Redenção"/"Deixa o Tempo"/"Revanche"
 Capital Inicial — "Depois da Meia-Noite"
 Hevo 84, Fake Number, Gloria and Replace (performed for the 20th anniversary of MTV Brasil) — "Zoio D Lula"/"Mulher de Fases"
 Otto — "Crua"
 OK Go — "This Too Shall Pass"
 Gaiola das Cabeçudas (featuring Valesca Popozuda) — "Funk Educativo"

Note: "Gaiola da Cabeçudas" is a humorous musical group formed by comedians and VJs of MTV Brasil, they are Marcelo Adnet, Rafael Queiroga, Paulinho Serra, Rodrigo Capella and Guilherme Santana, also a satire of the Brazilian funk carioca group Gaiola das Popozudas (Cage of Big-Asses), led by Valesca Popozuda, a real singer.

Appearances
 MariMoon — introduced Restart
 3OH!3 and Rafael Queiroga — introduced Fresno
 Palmirinha Onofre and Colírios Capricho — introduced Capital Inicial
 Sabrina Parlatore, Luíz Thunderbird and Bento Ribeiro — introduced the Special Jam Session of MTV Brasil' 20 Years
 Marcelo Adnet, Sabrina Sato and Charles Henrique — introduced Otto
 Marina Person and Cazé Peçanha — introduced OK Go!
 Larissa Riquelme and Ronald Rios — presented Best Live Performance
 Léo Santanna — presented MTV Bet
 Marcelo Adnet as Joel Santana, Dani Calabresa as Luciana Gimenez and Laura Fontana (Mini Lady Gaga) — presented Best International Act
 Roberto Justus — presented Best New Act
 Fudêncio — presented Best Game
 Raul Gil and Gui Santana as Raul Gil — presented Video of the Year
 Tatá Werneck as Fernandona and Carol Ribeiro — presented Web Hit of The Year
 Christian Chávez — presented Webstar of The Year
 Vanessa Hadi and Dedé from Scracho — presented Best International Bet and Best Electronic Music
 Funérea — presented Best Pop and Best MPB
 Fudêncio, Conrado and Funérea — presented Best Rap and Best Rock
 Danilo Gentili, Anderson Silva and Júnior Cigano — presented Hit of The Year
 Marcelo Adnet and Neymar — presented Act of the Year

External links
 MTV Brasil's Official Website
 VMB 2010 Hot Site
 Justin Biba by Galo Frito - Web Hit winner
 Não Faz Sentido! - Felipe Neto's channel on YouTube - Webstar winner

MTV Video Music Brazil
Mtv Video Music Brazil, 2010